Ian Bruce Irvine  (6 March 1929 – 5 November 2013) was a New Zealand rugby union player. A hooker, Irvine represented North Auckland at a provincial level. He played a single match for the New Zealand national side, the All Blacks, a test against Australia in 1952.

In the 2000 New Year Honours, Irvine was appointed a Member of the New Zealand Order of Merit, for services to the disabled.

References

1929 births
2013 deaths
People from Carterton, New Zealand
New Zealand rugby union players
New Zealand international rugby union players
Northland rugby union players
Rugby union hookers
Members of the New Zealand Order of Merit
People educated at Whangarei Boys' High School
Rugby union players from the Wellington Region